Corynellus aureus is a species of beetle in the family Cerambycidae. It was described by Linsley in 1961.

References

Pteroplatini
Beetles described in 1961